The Itchen Abbas railway station was in the county of Hampshire in England and opened on 2 October 1865 by the Mid-Hants Railway. It closed on 5 February 1973.

History

The station was originally built with two platforms but, in the 1930s, the up platform was taken out of use and only a single track serving the down platform was used. The station was destaffed in 1967.

It is unlikely the line will ever be re-opened to Winchester because the M3 and five houses have been built at various points on its route. At the beginning of the 1980s, the original station building was demolished and a new house built on the site, where parts of the platform still stand in its garden.

To the east, between the station site and Alresford, is the now disused but complete viaduct over Northington Road.

Route

References

Disused railway stations in Hampshire
Former London and South Western Railway stations
Railway stations in Great Britain opened in 1865
Railway stations in Great Britain closed in 1973
Beeching closures in England
1865 establishments in England
1973 disestablishments in England